The 2022–23 Coupe de France preliminary rounds, Nouvelle-Aquitaine is the qualifying competition to decide which teams from the leagues of the Nouvelle-Aquitaine region of France take part in the main competition from the seventh round.

A total of thirteen teams will qualify from the Nouvelle-Aquitaine preliminary rounds.

In 2021–22, Bergerac Périgord FC progressed furthest in the main competition, reaching the quarter-final, where they lost to FC Versailles 78.

Draws and fixtures
On 28 July 2022, the league confirmed that 680 teams from the region had entered the competition. On 29 July 2022, the league published the first round draw, with 284 ties featuring teams from Régional 2, Régional 3 and district divisions.

The second round draw was published on the leagues official Facebook page on 31 August 2022, with 189 ties including 94 teams entering from Régional 2 and Régional 1. The third round draw was published in the same place on 7 September 2022, with 100 ties including 11 teams entering from Championnat National 3. The fourth round draw was made live on the leagues official Facebook page on 16 September 2022, with the four teams from Championnat National 2 joining the competition. The fifth round draw was also made live on the leagues official Facebook page, on 30 September 2022. The sixth round draw was scheduled to be made live on Facebook on 10 October 2022, but due to a technical failure the full draw was published before the video was available.

First round
These matches were played on 26, 27 and 28 August 2022, with one replayed on 3 September 2022.

Second round
These matches were played on 3, 4 and 11 September 2022.

Third round
These matches were played on 10, 11 and 18 September 2022.

Fourth round
These matches were played on 24 and 25 September 2022.

Fifth round
These matches were played on 8 and 9 October 2022.

Sixth round
These matches were played on 15 and 16 October 2022.

References

Preliminary rounds